Thermocrinis minervae is a bacterium. Its cells are gram-negative and are approximately 2.4–3.9 micrometres long and 0.5–0.6 micrometres wide; they are motile rods with polar flagella. Its type strain is CR11T (=5DSM 19557T =5ATCC BAA-1533T).

References

Further reading
Dworkin, Martin, and Stanley Falkow, eds. The Prokaryotes: Vol. 7: Proteobacteria: Delta and Epsilon Subclasses. Deeply Rooting Bacteria. Vol. 7. Springer, 2006.

External links
LPSN

Type strain of Thermocrinis minervae at BacDive -  the Bacterial Diversity Metadatabase

Aquificota
Bacteria described in 2010